The 1957 FIBA World Championship for Women (Portuguese:Campeonato Mundial Feminino da Fiba de 1957) was the second FIBA World Championship for Women basketball championship held by FIBA. It was held in Brazil between 13 October and 26 October 1957. Twelve national teams entered the event under the auspices of FIBA, the sport's governing body. The city of Rio de Janeiro hosted the tournament. The United States won its second title after finishing in first place in the second round.

Format
In the preliminary round teams were split into three round-robin groups, two of four teams and one of three teams. The top two teams from each group advanced to the final round. Hosts Brazil advanced to the final round directly.
The teams that did not reach the final round, played in the classification round, which consisted of a round-robin group of five teams to define eighth through twelfth places in the final standings.
In the final, a seven-team round-robin group was formed to compete for the championship and second through seventh places in the final standings.

Preliminary round

Times given below are in Brasília time (UTC−3).

Group A

|}

Group B

|}

Group C

|}

Classification round

|}

Final round

|}

Final standings

References

Results (Archived 2009-05-20)
1957 World Championship for Women, FIBA.com.

FIBA Women's Basketball World Cup
FIBA
FIBA
FIBA
FIBA World Championship for Women